Anthony Neoh, KC, SC, JP is Chief Adviser to the China Securities Regulatory Commission. He is also a member of the corporate boards of Bank of China, China Life, and formerly on the board of China Shenhua. Trained as a lawyer, he is a leading Chinese expert on monetary policy, economics and other financial regulatory issues. Neoh was appointed as Hong Kong Securities and Investment Institute as Honorary Fellow in 2008.

Neoh is also chairman of the Independent Police Complaints Council.

References

Year of birth missing (living people)
Living people
Hong Kong Senior Counsel
Hong Kong economists
Members of the Selection Committee of Hong Kong
Hong Kong Queen's Counsel
20th-century King's Counsel